Ferris Bueller is a short-lived American sitcom television series based on the 1986 John Hughes film Ferris Bueller's Day Off. The show stars Charlie Schlatter in the title role. The series debuted on August 23, 1990, on NBC and was cancelled within its first season, a few months after its debut with only 13 episodes aired, due to its poor reception. The show was produced by Maysh, Ltd. Productions in association with Paramount Television.  Hughes was not involved in the show's production.

Synopsis
Though based on the film, the series was not a canon continuation; rather it was set up to portray itself as being the "real life" situations upon which the film was loosely based. In the pilot episode, Ferris (Schlatter) refers to the film and expresses his displeasure at Matthew Broderick portraying him, even going as far as destroying a life-size cardboard cutout of Broderick with a chainsaw. However no further references to the film within the series' continuity would be made after this. As in the film, the series focused on Ferris Bueller and his high school experiences at Ocean Park High, including dealing with his best friend Cameron (Brandon Douglas), love interest Sloan (Ami Dolenz), and sister Jeannie (Jennifer Aniston).

Although the film was set in Chicago, the series was set in Santa Monica. Like the film, Ferris is liked by everyone as the "cool guy on campus." He is extremely popular, suave, and quick witted and is a master of ceremonies who often breaks the fourth wall. Cameron is still a depressive neurotic who, through Ferris, is able to loosen up occasionally. Sloan is portrayed slightly different in that she is not completely wrapped around Ferris' finger and has to be won over at times. Ed Rooney is the primary antagonist and always out to get Ferris but usually ends up foiled or humiliated. His secretary, Grace, is not a wise-cracking sarcastic, but a passive pushover with an unreciprocated crush on Ed. Jeannie is constantly at odds with Ferris and his being favored by all. Though she can be antagonistic, she has proven not all bad, albeit begrudgingly. In the film, Mr. and Mrs. Bueller's names are Katie and Tom but in the series they are Barbara and Bob; also, Ferris is a junior and Jeannie is a senior as opposed to the other way around in the movie.

Cast

Starring 
 Charlie Schlatter as Ferris Bueller
 Richard Riehle as Principal Ed Rooney
 Sam Freed as Bill Bueller
 Jennifer Aniston as Jeannie Bueller
 Ami Dolenz as Sloan Peterson
 Brandon Douglas as Cameron Frye
 Judith Kahan as Grace
 Cristine Rose as Barbara Bueller

Recurring 
 Jeff Maynard as Arthur Petrelli
 Jerry Tullos as Mr. Rickets
 David Glasser as Dork
 Brandon Rane as Wimp
 Chris Claridge as Student #2/Surfer/Tim
 Bojesse Christopher as Greaser
 Jim DeMarse as Mr. Prescott/Mr. Tenser

Guest 
 Jane Lynch as Mrs. Tenser

Episodes

Season 1 (1990–91)

Reception and cancellation 
Compared to the film, the show received mostly negative reviews from critics. It also suffered from comparisons to not only the '80s film, but also another series, Parker Lewis Can't Lose; at the time that series initially proved to be more successful when it came to ratings, lasting for three seasons. Ratings for Ferris were strong at first, but declined in later episodes. The series was cancelled due to poor viewership and low ratings after one season airing a total of thirteen episodes.

References

External links
 
 
 

1990 American television series debuts
1991 American television series endings
1990s American high school television series
1990s American single-camera sitcoms
1990s American teen sitcoms
English-language television shows
NBC original programming
Live action television shows based on films
Television series about teenagers
Television series by CBS Studios
Television shows set in Santa Monica, California